KYMG (98.9 FM) is a commercial adult contemporary music radio station in Anchorage, Alaska. Its studios are located at Dimond Center in Anchorage, and its transmitter is located off Dowling Road in Southeast Anchorage.

References

External links

1989 establishments in Alaska
Mainstream adult contemporary radio stations in the United States
IHeartMedia radio stations
Radio stations established in 1989
YMG